Antrodiaetus pugnax is a species of folding-door spider in the family Antrodiaetidae. It is found in the United States.

References

 Bond J, Hamilton C, Garrison N, Ray C (2012). "Phylogenetic reconsideration of Myrmekiaphila systematics with a description of the new trapdoor spider species Myrmekiaphila tigris (Araneae, Mygalomorphae, Cyrtaucheniidae, Euctenizinae) from Auburn, Alabama". ZooKeys 190: 95-109.
 Bradley, Richard A. (2012). Common Spiders of North America. University of California Press.
 Ubick, Darrell (2005). Spiders of North America: An Identification Manual. American Arachnological Society.

Antrodiaetidae
Spiders described in 1917